Palm Valley School is a private college-preparatory, non-denominational and co-educational school located in Rancho Mirage, California, United States. It was founded in 1952 in Palm Springs, CA. The school moved to Rancho Mirage in 1992.

The school serves all grades from Preschool through Grade 12 on 34 acres of campus in Rancho Mirage, CA. The campus features separate campuses and buildings for each division with a total enrollment of 270 students as of 2017.
Preschool (6 weeks – 4 years)
Lower School (Grades K – 5th)
Middle School (Grades 6 – 8)
Upper School (Grades 9 – 12)

The average class size is under 20 with a student to teacher ratio of approx. 1:12. The College Counseling program graduates 100% of the senior class and 100% get accepted to college and university. The motto is "Paratus Vitae" ("Prepared for Life").

Notable alumni
 Alia Shawkat (Did not graduate),
 Bobbie Gentry,
 Paris Hilton (Did not graduate),

References

External links
Palm Valley School website

1952 establishments in California
Educational institutions established in 1952
High schools in Riverside County, California
Private elementary schools in California
Private high schools in California
Private middle schools in California
Rancho Mirage, California